Caucanthus is a genus of flowering plants belonging to the family Malpighiaceae.

Its native range is Tropical Africa, Arabian Peninsula.

Species:

Caucanthus albidus 
Caucanthus auriculatus 
Caucanthus edulis

References

Malpighiaceae
Malpighiaceae genera